Swachh Survekshan (lit. Sanskrit "Swachh" for Cleanliness and "Survekshan" for Survey - (सर्व (sarv, “all”) +‎ ईक्षण (īkṣaṇ, “viewing”) is an annual survey of cleanliness, hygiene and sanitation in villages, cities and towns across India. It was launched as part of the Swachh Bharat Abhiyan, which aimed to make India clean and free of open defecation by 2 October 2019. The first survey was undertaken in 2016 and covered 73 cities (53 cities with a population of over a million, and all state capitals); by 2020 the survey had grown to cover 4242 cities and was said to be the largest cleanliness survey in the world. The surveys are carried out by Quality Council of India.

Survey methodology

The survey is carried out by the Quality Council of India, which in 2020 covered 4242 cities and towns, It include 5 Lakhs+ ULB Document Evidence captured, 24 Lakhs+ Geotagged Photos captured from field and feedback from 1.9 crore people

Survey in 2020 was weighted on 6000 points.  The criteria and weightages for different components of sanitation related aspects used for the survey were:

a) Service Level Progress-1300 marks

b) Citizen feedback – 1500 marks

c) Direct observation – 1500 marks

d) GFC (SWM) 1,000 Marks; ODF /ODF+ / ODF++ 500 Marks

e) Average ranking of Quarterly Assessments (April 2019 to June 2019, July 2019 to Sep 2019, Oct 2019 to Dec 2019)-200 Marks

Highlights

In the 2020 survey 
 Indore, in Madhya Pradesh, is India’s cleanest city.
 Surat, in Gujarat, Ranked second cleanest city of india and was followed by Maharashtra's Navi Mumbai.
 Varanasi was adjudged the ‘best Ganga town’ in the central government’s cleanliness survey.
 A total of 1.9 crore citizens across 4,242 cities of the country participated in the survey held by the Ministry of Housing and Urban Affairs.
 The survey focused on collection segregated waste and maintenance till processing site, treatment and reuse of wastewater, curtailing solid waste-based air pollution, among other factors.

In the 2017 survey 
 Indore, in Madhya Pradesh, was India’s cleanest city and Gonda, in Uttar Pradesh, was the filthiest
 Of 10 cleanest cities, two were are from Madhya Pradesh, Gujarat and Andhra Pradesh each, while Karnataka, Tamil Nadu, Delhi and Maharashtra each had one
 Out of 10 dirtiest cities, Uttar Pradesh had five cities, two each were from Bihar and Punjab, and one from Maharashtra
 118 out of 500 cities were found to be Open Defecation Free
 297 cities had 100% door to door collection of garbage
 37 lakh citizens showed interest in Swachh Surveksan
 There were 404 cities in which at least 75% of residential areas were found substantially clean
 Gujarat had 12 cities among the top 50 cleanest, followed by Madhya Pradesh with 11 and Andhra Pradesh with eight
 Four of the dirtiest cities were in Uttar Pradesh and 50 of the state's towns were ranked 305 and below

Pre-evaluation results

Kota city
The Swachh Sarvekshan survey experts gave a score of 525 out of 6000 to the municipal corporation of Kota. Kota, a city in Rajasthan that is famous for its IIT and Medical coaching centres, is seriously criticized by Swachhta Mission. The city is located at the bank of the Chambal River and is home to six government universities, Rajasthan Technical University, Indian Institute of Information Technology (IIIT), University of Kota, Agriculture University, Vardhman Mahaveer Open University, and Agriculture University. None of these institutions initiated any research projects to alleviate such endangered situation and disruptions. Every day tons of garbage and chemical materials are disposed directly into the Chambal river. The National Brand Ambassador of Swachh Bharat Mission Dr. DP Sharma evaluated the status of the city after the latest evaluation and also criticized the city's Municipal Corporation for its Swachhta management. According to his evaluation the city scored 545 marks out of 6000 point scale. Dainik Bhaskar, a regional newspaper also covered the issue and took stock of the cleanliness of the city. The next day more than 49 NGOs and social activists mobilized public-private institutions and individuals to take the oath to keep the city neat and clean. A local career centre in the city has created a separate cleanness brigade to support the Swachhta mission and clean the city's roads and crematoriums.

Survey results

According to the 2020 survey,  Swachh Survekshan Results 2020: Indore in Madhya Pradesh retained its position as the cleanest city in India for the fourth consecutive year, according to the Swachh Survekshan 2020 survey results.

While Gujarat’s Surat bagged the second spot, Maharashtra’s Navi Mumbai ranked third. Varanasi was adjudged the ‘best Ganga town’ in the central government’s cleanliness survey.

References

Water supply and sanitation in India